Anahō is a bay of Nuka Hiva, Marquesas Islands. The bay and beach are situated near Hakahau.

References

Geography of the Marquesas Islands